The Basketball Tournament 2020 was the seventh edition of The Basketball Tournament (TBT), a 5-on-5, single elimination basketball tournament. The tournament, involving 24 teams, started on July 4 and continued through the championship game on July 14, with all games held at Nationwide Arena in Columbus, Ohio. The winner of the final, Golden Eagles, received a $1 million prize.

Format 

Initial plans for TBT 2020 called for a field of 64 teams, organized into eight regions of 8 teams, all of which would be seeded. Each regional in the 2019 edition was hosted by a competing team, with the winner of each regional received a prize equal to 25% of that region's ticket proceeds, although it was unclear whether this procedure was slated to continue in 2020. The open entry period was set as March 15 to June 15.

Due to the COVID-19 pandemic, it was announced on June 11 that the start of the event would be moved up to July 4 in a modified form, with the entire tournament taking place at Nationwide Arena in Columbus, Ohio, and downsized to 24 teams with a $1,000,000 purse. It marked the first televised basketball event held in the United States since the onset of the pandemic and the suspension of all U.S. professional sports in mid-March, as the NBA did not plan to resume its 2019–20 season until July 31 (with all games hosted by the ESPN Wide World of Sports complex in Orlando, Florida). TBT 2020 organizers put extensive quarantine and testing protocols in place, including the immediate disqualification of any team that had a player test positive. Games were broadcast via ESPN networks (with ESPN having also announced a renewal of its media rights to the tournament), and closed to the public. State governor Mike DeWine considered the event "another step forward in our state's efforts to responsibly restart Ohio".

As with previous years, all tournament games operated with the "Elam Ending", a format of ending the game without use of a game clock. Under the Elam Ending, the clock is turned off at the first dead-ball whistle with under four minutes to play in the game. At that time, a target score, equal to the score of the leading team plus eight, is set, and the first team to reach this target score is declared the winner of the game. Thus, all games end on a made basket (field goal or free throw) and there is no overtime.

Teams
Multiple teams in the tournament were expected to be comprised mostly or exclusively of alumni of a particular school, program, or a group of closely related schools. As early as October 2019, Florida State had announced plans to enter a team, and St. Bonaventure and Virginia Tech had also announced the same by the end of 2019.  In January 2020, Purdue also announced plans to enter a team. By the end of February 2020, Alabama, Illinois, Marshall, Maryland, Oklahoma State, and Virginia had also announced plans to enter TBT 2020. The status of defending champion Carmen's Crew (Ohio State) was initially uncertain; the team did officially enter by early March. Other alumni teams confirmed included Syracuse, West Virginia, and Wichita State. Additionally, Luke Hancock announced that he was exploring entering a Louisville alumni team.

Ultimately, alumni teams from Clemson, Dayton, Illinois, Marquette, Marshall, Ohio State, Oklahoma State, Purdue, Syracuse, and West Virginia were entered, along with teams representing the Big Ten and Mid-American (MAC) conferences. The remaining fifteen teams were not associated with a specific school or conference. The teams representing West Virginia and the MAC would later withdraw, due to each having a player test positive for COVID-19.

The tournament bracket was released on June 16, 2020.

Key:

Replacements
Tournament organizers announced that any team that had a player test positive for COVID-19 would be immediately disqualified and removed from the tournament. Five teams had positive tests; all five were removed before playing in the tournament. Four of the teams were replaced, with the final removal, that of Eberlein Drive, resulting in another team being awarded a walkover.

On June 22, Best Virginia (No. 10), a team for West Virginia alumni, withdrew after having several players test positive. They were replaced by Playing for Jimmy V, a team in support of the V Foundation.
On July 1, Jackson TN UnderDawgs (No. 24) were diagnosed with a case and replaced by D2, a team of former NCAA Division II players.
On July 2, Mid-American Unity (No. 20), had one of their players test positive, although he was asymptomatic. The team withdrew and was replaced by PrimeTime Players.
On July 3, Playing for Jimmy V (No. 10), themselves a replacement team, had a player test positive and were subsequently disqualified. They were replaced with Peoria All-Stars.
On July 5, the day before their opening game, Eberlein Drive (No. 5) was disqualified after a player tested positive, despite being asymptomatic. Their Round of 16 opponent, Brotherly Love, advanced automatically to the quarterfinals.

Squads

Schedule

Tournament bracket

Game summaries

Round of 24

Round of 16

Quarterfinals

Semifinals

Championship

Championship game statistics
Statistics for the title game are below. The championship basket (reaching the Elam Ending target score) was made by Travis Diener.

Key

Golden Eagles

Coach: Joe Chapman

Inactive: Andrew Rowsey

Sideline Cancer

Coach: Charles Parker
Asst: Jordan Griffith

Inactive: Diamond Stone

Awards

Source:

References

Further reading

External links
 
 2020 TBT Semi-Finals – #4 Golden Eagles vs #8 Red Scare Highlights via YouTube
 2020 TBT Semi-Finals – #2 Overseas Sideline vs #22 Sideline Cancer Highlights via YouTube
 2020 TBT Final – # 4 Golden Eagles vs #22 Sideline Cancer Highlights via YouTube

The Basketball Tournament
2020–21 in American basketball
July 2020 sports events in the United States
Basketball in Columbus, Ohio
Basketball competitions in Ohio
Basketball Tournament
2020 in sports in Ohio
21st century in Columbus, Ohio